Francisco Hernando Contreras (2 June 1945 – 3 April 2020), known as Paco el Pocero, was a Spanish businessman in the construction industry.

From a humble background, Hernando became a prominent builder in the Madrid area. His most famous project is probably Seseña near Madrid, where he promised to build 13,500 residences. Following the collapse of the Spanish property bubble, he went to Equatorial Guinea leaving Spanish projects unfinished. 

He died on 3 April 2020 of coronavirus disease 2019.

References

1940s births
2020 deaths
Deaths from the COVID-19 pandemic in Spain
21st-century Spanish businesspeople
Housing in Spain
Businesspeople from Madrid
Spanish expatriates in Equatorial Guinea